Castagnola may refer to:

 Castagnola-Cassarate, quarter of the city of Lugano, in the Swiss canton of Ticino
 Castagnola, Switzerland, village on the northern shore of Lake Lugano, Switzerland
 Castagnola (surname), Italian surname
 Castagnola's, historical restaurant in San Francisco, California, United States of America

See also
 Castagnole (disambiguation)